e-khool LMS is a learning management system suitable for online engineering education  and schools.

Research

e-khool LMS is used by educational researchers to conduct their research using this online learning platform. The data associated with the e-khool LMS is utilized by them for learner performance prediction,  course recommendation, learner privacy  and learner sentimental analysis.

References 

Learning management systems